Newa Festival refers to the festivals that are celebrated by the Newas. Newas are well known for their lavish festivals. The word Jatra is used for carnivals.

List of festivals 
Based on Nepalese calendar, Nepal Sambat, the different festivals are:

 Swanti
 Sakimila Punhi 
 Yoma 
 Yomari Punhi
 Ghayh 
 Swasthani 
 Shree Panchami
 Sila Chahre 
 Holi Punhi 
 Pahan Charhe 
 Bisket Jatra
 Jana Baha Dyah Jatra
 Bungdya Jatra
 Bhoto Jatra 
 Swanya Punhi 
 Sithi Nakhah 
 Gathan Mugah 
 Gunla
 Gunhu Punhi 
 kuchhi bhoyey 
 
 Pancha Dan
 Yenya
 Mohani
 Mataya (Lalitpur)

External links
 Jwajalapa

Newar